Satyavathi Rathod, colloquially and popularly known as Mangli, is an Indian playback singer, television presenter and actress. She is popular for her traditional Banjara attire and known for her Telangana songs and performance at festival events in India and abroad. She is presently working with a Telugu-language web channel, Mic TV, featuring in popular video songs on special occasions like Bathukamma, Bonalu, Sankranthi, Telangana Formation Day, Ugadhi, Sammakka Sarakka Jatara and many.

Early life
Mangli was born in a Banjara community. Her mother tongue (native language) is Lambadi. She did her diploma in Carnatic Music from SV University. Her father encouraged her to become a singer from a young age. Inspired by her teachers, she wanted to become a music teacher. Mangli moved to Hyderabad and Bengaluru to begin a career in anchoring.

Mangli has a younger sister, Indravathi Chauhan, who became famous after singing the hit song "Oo Antava Oo Oo Antava" from the movie Pushpa: The Rise. The song was dubbed in Kannada and Mangli sang the Kannada lyrics for the dubbed version.

Career
She got her first break in her career in 2013, when she was invited as a guest artist on Telugu News channel, V6 News for a Dasara festival special show called as Dhoom Dham. Her popular show on V6 News, where she played as Maatakari Mangli, on the satirical news show, Teenmaar Vaarthalu, along with Bithiri Sathi and Savitri was a hit. She worked with HMTV news channel's, Jordar News on the satirical news show along with Sujatha.

She is presently working with a web channel, MIC TV as an anchor and folk song singer. She interviews celebrities called as Mangli Muchata with. She sings songs on Telangana festivals like Bathukamma, Bonalu and Telangana Formation Day. Her song, Orugallu Kotanadugu, for 2018 Telangana Formation Day has become a hit. She sang in some Tollywood films like Sapthagiri Express, Raj Mahal, Needhi Naadi Oka Katha, George Reddy and  ''Ramuloo Ramulaa'' song from 2020 action-drama Tollywood film Ala Vaikunthapurramuloo.

In February 2018, she contested on a show hosted by Lakshmi Manchu Maharani. In 2021, her song “Saranga Dariya” for the film Love Story became widely popular.

Filmography

Discography

Film and television songs

As Playback singer

Singles (Non-film songs)

As lead artist

As featured artist

References

External links

Living people
Indian television presenters
1989 births
Indian women playback singers
Telugu playback singers
Women musicians from Andhra Pradesh
Film musicians from Andhra Pradesh
21st-century Indian women singers
21st-century Indian singers
Indian women television presenters
Telugu television anchors